The South Alabama Jaguars women's basketball represents the University of South Alabama in NCAA Division I competition. They are a member of the Sun Belt Conference.

History

South Alabama began play in 1974. They have made the NCAA tournament once (1987) and the WNIT four times (1988, 2003, 2004, 2019). They have won the Sun Belt regular season title five times (1987, 1989, 1990, 2003, 2004), but have never won the tournament title. They have finished as runner up in 1984, 1987, 1989, and 2019. As of the end of the 2015–16 season, the Jaguars have an all-time record of 571–610.

NCAA tournament results

References

External links